The VinylDisc is a combination of a digital layer, either in CD or DVD format, and an analog layer, which is a vinyl record, developed by the German company Optimal Media Production.
It consists of a silver layer containing CD or DVD and a black polyvinyl chloride layer (able to hold 3.5 minutes of audio on 33⅓ rpm) which can be played on a regular phonograph.

Examples of singles already released in the hybrid format are Paramore's "Misery Business", The Mars Volta's cover of "Candy and a Currant Bun" by Pink Floyd, and the 2017 album "Hyakki Echo" by Merzbow and Fightstar's "Deathcar" which reportedly had a limited run of 3000 copies. A sample VinylDisc to promote this new format was given to visitors of the 2007 Popkomm, containing music by Jazzanova, where it was presented in September 2007.

References

External links 
 
 VinylDisc in Museum Of Obsolete Media

Audio storage